Tobias Charles Tarrant (born 29 October 1991) is an English radio broadcaster on Radio X.

Career
Tarrant started his national radio broadcasting career on Capital FM, presenting the early breakfast show in 2014.

In October 2016, he moved to the same time slot on Radio X, presenting from 4am to 6:30am. He also began covering The Chris Moyles Show when Chris Moyles was on leave.

Due to his profile being raised after increasing the listener figures on his early show by 29%, and also by appearing on Moyles' show, Tarrant moved to the mid-morning slot (10am-1pm) in April 2018, taking over from Jack Saunders.

In October 2018, Tarrant won an episode of the BBC One show Pointless with fellow Radio X DJ Johnny Vaughan (who replaced his father on the Breakfast Show at Capital).

Personal life
Tarrant is the youngest son of broadcaster Chris Tarrant who previously presented the breakfast show on Capital FM between 1987 and 2004, and his former wife Ingrid. One of his sisters, Fia, is a fellow radio broadcaster who works for Heart.

Tarrant attended Parkside School and Reed's School in Cobham, Surrey.

Tarrant is a fan of Reading and Liverpool, and plays cricket for Surrey side Stoke D'Abernon.

He has been dating Pippa Taylor, the executive producer of The Chris Moyles Show, since July 2017. In 2018, Tarrant and Taylor moved in together and in order to help furnish the property, Moyles gave the listeners the John Lewis gift list address. By the end of the show, all of the items had been purchased. Pippa announced their engagement on The Chris Moyles Show on 20 July 2020. They married on the 16th of September 2022.

Tarrant ran the London Marathon for the charity "Make Some Noise" in 2018, achieving a time of 04:35:27 and placed 12,279th. He raised over £31,000 for his efforts. One of the main reasons for the high total was due to his agreement with Moyles that he would cycle around Leicester Square naked if he raised over £30,000.

References

External links 

1991 births
Living people
English radio DJs
English radio presenters
People from Esher
People educated at Reed's School
People educated at Parkside School, Cobham